Aytugan (Aytuğan) is a rural locality (a selo) in Yasherganovsky Selsoviet, Sterlibashevsky District, Bashkortostan, Russia. The population was 203 as of 2010. There are 5 streets.

Geography 
Aytugan is located 36 km southwest of Sterlibashevo (the district's administrative centre) by road. Nizhneibrayevo is the nearest rural locality.

References 

Rural localities in Sterlibashevsky District